Make Believe Revue is a 1935 Color Rhapsodies short produced by Screen Gems and distributed by Columbia Pictures.

Summary
Flown away to the land of the story books, Jack and Jill, aided by Mother Goose, watch a fairyland revue complete with chorus girls and marching soldiers.

References

1935 animated films
1930s animated short films
American animated short films
1930s American animated films
Columbia Pictures short films
1935 short films
Screen Gems short films
Films based on nursery rhymes
Columbia Pictures animated short films
Color Rhapsody